Callinaz is a Swedish dansband presently made up of Carolina, Andreas, Mikael, Tom and Simon. The band debuted with the 2011 album Från mörker till ljus that reached number 8 on Sverigetopplistan the official Swedish Albums Chart. The band has released 5 albums.

Discography

Albums

References

External links
Official website

Dansbands
Atenzia Records artists